Maneet Ahuja (born 1984) is an American author, journalist, television news producer, and hedge fund specialist.  She is a producer of CNBC's morning business news program, Squawk Box.  Her 2012 book, The Alpha Masters: Unlocking the Genius of the World's Top Hedge Funds, was published by John Wiley & Sons and nominated for an FT / Goldman Sachs Book of the Year Award.  Forbes named her to their "30 Under 30" list of media figures for 2012.  Ahuja has also produced a number of business events including CNBC's Delivering Alpha conference, a hedge fund summit that she created and co-developed. Ahuja serves on the Council of Advocates for Mt. Sinai Hospital and is on the United Nations Commission on the Status of Women. Her next book is The Techtonics.

Career

Finance and journalism

Ahuja began her finance career at the age of 17 when she interned at Citigroup in 2002 as a credit risk analyst.  After ten months, Ahuja became a full-time employee. She remained at Citigroup for nearly four years before moving to Merrill Lynch as a global economics and equity research intern.  She later became one of The Wall Street Journal'''s youngest reporters, working on their Money & Investing team.

Ahuja joined CNBC in 2008, and the following year she was awarded the network's Enterprise Award for her coverage of the hedge fund industry.  Ahuja's work on CNBC's Squawk Box includes the first on-air appearance made by   Ray Dalio, Founder and CIO of the world's largest hedge fund Bridgewater Associates and David Tepper—hedge fund manager and the founder of Appaloosa Management, coverage of David Einhorn's warning call before the collapse of Lehman Brothers, and John Paulson's communication to investors following an SEC investigation into the Goldman Sachs "Abacus" deals.  She has also covered the World Economic Forum in Davos, Switzerland.  In December 2012, Ahuja and CNBC colleague, Kate Kelly, made the first report that Bill Ackman, manager of Pershing Square Capital Management, had a short position on Herbalife, a multi-level marketing company that sells health care products, and considered their business model to be a pyramid scheme.

Events
Ahuja co-founded and created CNBC's Delivering Alpha conference, a hedge fund summit launched in conjunction with Institutional Investor.  She produces events for Harvard Business School's U.S. Competitiveness Project and quarterly shows at the United States Department of Labor with Alan Greenspan, former Chairman of the Federal Reserve.  Ahuja served as the master of ceremonies at the Wharton Economic Summit held at Lincoln Center in New York City March 2013.

Ahuja also co-founded CNBC's popular "Disruptors" series initiative focusing on tech startups in the Valley and beyond. She interviewed tech legend Marc Andreessen for Andreessen Horowitz's inaugural Capital Summit at Cavallo Point September 2015.

Awards
In October 2012 the South Asian Journalists Association awarded Ahuja and Devin Banerjee of Bloomberg News grants to attend seminars for business journalists at the Wharton School of the University of Pennsylvania.

The Alpha Masters
Ahuja's book, The Alpha Masters: Unlocking the Genius of the World's Top Hedge Funds'' was published by John Wiley & Sons in May 2012.  The nine-chapter book features profiles of 11 executives in the hedge fund industry: Ray Dalio of Bridgewater Associates, Pierre Lagrange and Tim Wong of Man Group, John Paulson of Paulson & Co., Marc Lasry and Sonia Gardner of Avenue Capital Group, David Tepper of Appaloosa Management, Bill Ackman of Pershing Square Capital Management, Daniel S. Loeb of Third Point LLC, James Chanos of Kynikos Associates LP, and Boaz Weinstein of Saba Capital Management.  The book's foreword was written by Mohamed A. El-Erian, CEO of PIMCO, and its afterword by economist Myron Scholes, 1997 winner of the Nobel Memorial Prize in Economic Sciences.

References

External links
 

1984 births
Living people
American business and financial journalists
Television producers from New York City
Citigroup employees
Merrill (company) people
The Wall Street Journal people